Dmitry Grigoryevich Levitsky (May 1735 – 17 April 1822) was a Russian portrait painter and Academician.

Biography
In 1758, he moved to Saint Petersburg to become a pupil of the Russian artist Aleksey Antropov, who had been in Kiev to create decorative paintings at the Cathedral of St Andrew. He also studied with Giuseppe Valeriani. In 1764, he established himself as a free-lance artist.

In 1770, Levitzky became famous after the exhibition of six of his portraits in the Imperial Academy of Arts; notably for a portrait of the architect Alexander Kokorinov. As a result, he was named an Academician and appointed Professor of the portrait painting class at the Academy. He remained in this position until 1788, when he resigned, citing an eye disease, although it may have been for political reasons. In 1807, he was invited back to the Academy by Tsar Alexander I. One of his best known students was Vladimir Borovikovsky.

In 1772–1776 Levitzky worked on a series of portraits of the pupils of the privileged women's establishment, the Smolny Institute for Young Ladies, in St. Petersburg. They were commissioned by Catherine II. The girls are depicted performing dances, music, and plays. His portrait of Denis Diderot is said to be the only one the philosopher liked.

Though Levitzky had many commissions, they were, in most cases, poorly paid, and the painter died in poverty in 1822.

Works

References

Further reading
 Dmitry Grigoryevich Levitsky @ the Encyclopedia Krugosvet
 Dmitry Grigoryevich Levitsky @ the Short Biographical Encyclopedia

External links

 More works by Levitzky @ ArtNet
 Levitsky in Olga's gallery

1735 births
1822 deaths
18th-century painters from the Russian Empire
Russian male painters
19th-century painters from the Russian Empire
Russian people of Ukrainian descent
Russian portrait painters
Ukrainian painters
Ukrainian male painters
Artists from Kyiv
National University of Kyiv-Mohyla Academy alumni
19th-century male artists from the Russian Empire